Apterin is a furanocoumarin and the glucoside of vaginol. It has been isolated from the root of plants in the family Apiaceae such as members of the genus Angelica, including the garden angelica and Zizia aptera.

References 

Coumarin glycosides
Furanocoumarins